The 1960 Nations motorcycle Grand Prix was the seventh and final round of the 1960 Grand Prix motorcycle racing season. It took place on September 11, 1960, at the Autodromo Nazionale Monza.

500 cc classification

350 cc classification

250 cc classification

125 cc classification

References

Italian motorcycle Grand Prix
Nations Grand Prix
Nations Grand Prix